Edward Kai Wang (born March 12, 1987) is a former American football offensive tackle. He played college football at Virginia Tech and was drafted by the Buffalo Bills in the 2010 NFL Draft. Wang was the first full-blooded Chinese player to both be drafted and to play in the NFL.

High school career
Wang was born in Fairfax, Virginia. He attended Stone Bridge High School in Ashburn, where he was selected the Gatorade State Player of the Year in 2004.

College career
Wang attended Virginia Tech and was awarded 2009 All-ACC Second-team for his performance at left tackle for the Hokies.  He was given the nickname, "Godzilla" due to his aggressive playing style, size, and Asian heritage.

Professional career

Buffalo Bills
Wang was selected with the 9th pick in the 5th round (140th overall) by the Buffalo Bills. During the 2010 NFL season, he was a reserve offensive lineman and played in six games, starting none. He was waived/injured by the Bills on September 3, 2011, and placed on injured reserve on September 4. He was released by the Bills on November 8, 2011.

Oakland Raiders
Wang signed with the Oakland Raiders on May 2, 2012. He was waived/injured by the Raiders on August 27 and placed on injured reserve on August 28. On September 5, 2012, he was waived after agreeing to an injury settlement.

Philadelphia Eagles
On February 15, 2013, Wang signed a two-year deal with the Philadelphia Eagles. On August 19, 2013, he was released by the Eagles.

Personal
Wang's parents were both track and field athletes for China at the 1984 Summer Olympics. His younger brother, David Wang, also played football for Virginia Tech, spent the 2015 off-season with the Saint Louis Rams, played for the Guangzhou Power of the China Arena Football League (CAFL) in 2016 and the Washington Valor of the Arena Football League in 2017. Ed married his wife, Christina, in April 2013.

Wang is the President for the CAFL.

See also
 Asian Americans in sports

References

External links
 Oakland Raiders bio 
 Virginia Tech Hokies bio 

1987 births
Living people
American football offensive tackles
American sportspeople of Chinese descent
Virginia Tech Hokies football players
Players of American football from Virginia
Buffalo Bills players
Sportspeople from Fairfax, Virginia
American sports executives and administrators
People from Ashburn, Virginia